Akbar's tomb is the tomb of the Mughal emperor Akbar. It was built in 1605–1613 by his son, Jahangir and is situated on 119 acres of grounds in Sikandra, a suburb of Agra, Uttar Pradesh, India.

Location
It is located at Sikandra, in the suburbs of Agra, on the Mathura road (NH2), 8 km west-northwest of the city center. About 1 km away from the tomb, lies, Tomb of Mariam-uz-Zamani, his favourite wife, who after the death of Akbar laid a large garden around his tomb and was later buried there by her son, Jahangir.

History

 
After Akbar's death, his son Jahangir planned and completed the construction of his father's tomb in 1605–1613. It cost 1,500,000 rupees to build and took 3 or 4 years to complete. Mariam-uz-Zamani, after the death of her husband, Akbar, laid a large garden around his tomb.
 
During the reign of Aurangzeb, Jats rose in rebellion under the leadership of Raja Ram Jat. Mughal prestige suffered a blow when Jats ransacked Akbar's tomb, plundering and looting the gold, jewels, silver, and carpets. The grave was opened and the late king's bones were burned.
 
As Viceroy of India, George Curzon directed extensive repairs and restoration of Akbar's mausoleum, which were completed in 1905. Curzon discussed the restoration of the mausoleum and other historical buildings in Agra in connection with the passage of the Ancient Monuments Preservation Act in 1904 when he described the project as "an offering of reverence to the past and a gift of
recovered beauty to the future". This preservation project may have discouraged veneration of the mausoleum by pilgrims and people living nearby.

Architecture

The south gate is the largest, with four white marble chhatri-topped minarets which are similar to (and pre-date) those of the Taj Mahal, and is the normal point of entry to the tomb.  The tomb itself is surrounded by a walled enclosure 105 m square. The tomb building is a four-tiered pyramid, surmounted by a marble pavilion containing the false tomb.  The true tomb, as in other mausoleums, is in the basement. The buildings are constructed mainly from a deep red sandstone, enriched with features in white marble.  Decorated inlaid panels of these materials and a black slate adorn the tomb and the main gatehouse.  Panel designs are geometric, floral and calligraphic, and prefigure the more complex and subtle designs later incorporated in Itmad-ud-Daulah's Tomb.

Gallery

See also
 Akbar
 Akbarnama
 Tomb of Mariam-uz-Zamani, tomb of the chief queen consort of Akbar
 Tomb of Jahangir, tomb of Akbar's successor 
 Humayun's Tomb, tomb of Akbar's father
 Bagh-e Babur, tomb of Akbar's grandfather

References

Further reading

External links

 ASI's page on Akbar's tomb

Buildings and structures completed in 1613
Buildings and structures in Agra
Mughal tombs
Mausoleums in Uttar Pradesh
Persian gardens in India
Tourist attractions in Agra
Akbar
1613 establishments in the Mughal Empire
Sandstone buildings in India